Turňa Castle is a castle in Turňa nad Bodvou.

References

Castles in Slovakia
Buildings and structures in Košice Region